Izgrev is a village in Tsarevo Municipality, in Burgas Province, in southeastern Bulgaria. It is situated in Strandzha mountains.

Honours
Izgrev Passage in Antarctica is named after the village.

References

Villages in Burgas Province